Reynald Lemaître (born 28 June 1983) is a French former professional footballer who played as a left-back.

Career
Lemaître was born in Chambray-lès-Tours, and spent most of his playing career with Stade Malherbe Caen. He scored 18 goals in 188 league matches for the club.

He left Caen to join AS Nancy, signing a three-year contract in 2009.

Having been released by Nancy in summer 2012, Lemaître trialled at Ligue 2 side Guingamp before signing a six-month contract with the club.

In January 2018, he joined Tahitian club A.S. Dragon.

References

External links
 
 
 

Living people
1983 births
People from Chambray-lès-Tours
Sportspeople from Indre-et-Loire
Association football defenders
French footballers
Stade Malherbe Caen players
AS Nancy Lorraine players
En Avant Guingamp players
Ligue 1 players
Ligue 2 players
Championnat National 3 players
Footballers from Centre-Val de Loire